Pawnee Creek is a  tributary that joins the South Platte River in Logan County, Colorado south of Sterling.  The creek's source is in Weld County at the confluence of North Pawnee Creek and South Pawnee Creek in Pawnee National Grassland.

The creek is named after the Pawnee Tribe.

See also
List of rivers of Colorado

References

Rivers of Logan County, Colorado
Rivers of Weld County, Colorado
Rivers of Colorado
Tributaries of the Platte River